Toykino is a rural locality (a selo) and the administrative center of Toykinskoye Rural Settlement, Bolshesosnovsky District, Perm Krai, Russia. The population was 295 as of 2010. There are 6 streets.

Geography 
Toykino is located 29 km southwest of Bolshaya Sosnova (the district's administrative centre) by road. Yasnaya Polyana is the nearest rural locality.

References 

Rural localities in Bolshesosnovsky District